The Kansan may refer to:

 Kansas City Kansan, newspaper
 Newton Kansan, newspaper
 The Kansan (film)

See also
 University Daily Kansan, student newspaper serving the University of Kansas, often referred to as The Kansan